Miloslav Mečíř was the defending champion but lost in the semifinals to Jimmy Connors.

Mats Wilander won in the final 6–4, 4–6, 6–4, 6–4 against Connors.

Seeds

Main draw

Finals

Top half

Section 1

Section 2

Section 3

Section 4

Bottom half

Section 5

Section 6

Section 7

Section 8

References
 1988 Lipton International Players Championships Draw

Men's Singles